Sensorimotor psychotherapy, developed by Pat Ogden, is a trademarked method of somatic psychotherapy. It joins cognitive and somatic techniques. It assumes that trauma can have effects on the body and can manifest as somatic symptoms, and that working with these symptoms can aid the therapeutic outcome.

References 

Fisher, A. G. & Murray, E. A. (1991). Introduction to sensory integration theory. In A. Fisher, E. Murray, & A. Bundy (Eds.), Sensory integration: Theory and practice (pp. 3–26). Philadelphia: Davis.
McFarlane, A. C. (1996). Resilience, vulnerability, and the course of posttraumatic reactions. In B. Van der Kolk, A. C. McFarlane, & L. Weisaeth (Eds.), Traumatic stress: The effects of overwhelming experience on mind, body, and society (pp. 155–181). New York: Guilford.
Ogden, P., Minton, K., and Pain, C. (2006). Trauma and the body:  A sensorimotor approach to psychotherapy.  New York: W.W. Norton.
 Ogden, P., and Fisher, J. (2015). Sensorimotor Psychotherapy: Interventions in Trauma and Attachment.  New York: W. W. Norton.
Van der Kolk, B. A. (1996). The body keeps the score; Approaches to the psychobiology of posttraumatic stress disorder. In B. Van der Kolk, A. C. McFarlane, & L. Weisaeth (Eds.), Traumatic stress: The effects of overwhelming experience on mind, body, and society (pp. 214–241). New York: Guilford.

Notes

External links
 Sensorimotor Psychotherapy Institute

Body psychotherapy